In September 2016, Kenya hosted the national teams of Qatar, Saudi Arabia and Uganda for two quadrangular series. A 50-over series took place from 20 to 24 September, and this was followed by a Twenty20 series. Matches did not have official One Day International or Twenty20 International status as none of the participating teams had either status at the time. The matches were played at the Gymkhana Club Ground and the Jaffery Sports Club Ground, both in Nairobi.

The hosts topped the round-robin tournament table in the 50-over series, before defeating Saudi Arabia by six wickets in the final. The East African sides were both eliminated after the round-robin stage of the T20 series and the final was played between Saudi Arabia and Qatar, a match that was won by Saudi Arabia by 7 wickets.

Squads

50-Over Series

Points table

Matches

Final

T20 Series

Points table

Matches

Final

References

External links
 Series home at ESPN Cricinfo (50-over)
 Series home at ESPN Cricinfo (T20)

2016 in Kenyan cricket
International cricket competitions in 2016
International cricket competitions in Kenya